Ardhamagadhi Prakrit was a Middle Indo-Aryan language and a Dramatic Prakrit thought to have been spoken in modern-day Bihar and Uttar Pradesh and used in some early Buddhist and Jain drama. It was likely a Central Indo-Aryan language, related to Pali and the later Sauraseni Prakrit.

It was originally thought to be a predecessor of the vernacular Magadhi Prakrit, hence the name (literally "half-Magadhi").

Relationship with Pali
Both Gautama Buddha and the tirthankara Mahavira preached in the region of Magadha.

Ardhamāgadhī differs from later Magadhi Prakrit on similar points as Pāli. For example, Ardhamāgadhī preserves historical [l], unlike later Magadhi, where [l] changed into [r]. Additionally, in the noun inflection, Ardhamagadhi shows the ending [-o] instead of Magadhi Prakrit [-e] in many metrical places.

Pali: Dhammapada 103:

Ardhamagadhi: Saman Suttam 125:

References

External links
 An Illustrated Ardha-Magadhi Dictionary

Prakrit languages
History of Bihar